Nicholas J. Mills is a Professor of Insect Population Ecology at the University of California, Berkeley.

He was educated at the University of East Anglia where he received a BSc in Biological Sciences and a  PhD in Population Ecology. He then undertook postdoctoral research at Lincoln College, Oxford. He was awarded a DANR Distinguished Service Award, Outstanding Faculty, in 1997, and a CNR Distinguished Teaching Award in 2002. He is also a Curator at the Essig Museum of Entomology at the University of California, Berkeley.

References

Living people
Alumni of the University of East Anglia
University of California, Berkeley faculty
Year of birth missing (living people)